The FilmArtFestival Mecklenburg-Pomerania (German: filmkunstfest Mecklenburg-Vorpommern) is held annually in the city of Schwerin in the German state of Mecklenburg-Vorpommern. It was founded in 1991 and it is one of the largest film festivals in eastern Germany, attracting more than 17,000 visitors. It has competitions for best German-language feature film, documentary film and short film produced or co-produced in Germany, Austria or Switzerland. The main prize is the Fliegender Ochse ('Flying Ox'), a nod the ox on the coat of arms of Mecklenburg-Vorpommern. The main prize is endowed with 10,000 Euros given by the Ministry of Education, Science and Culture of Mecklenburg-Vorpommern. The Findling Award is given by the Verband für Filmkommunikation, an umbrella organization for art house cinemas and film clubs.

The festival usually takes place in the first week of May.

Prize of Honour
Since 2002 the Prize of Honour, the Goldener Ochse ('Golden Ox') has been given to an honoured guest of the festival for special contributions to German film.

 2002: Frank Beyer
 2003: Mario Adorf
 2004: Götz George
 2005: Senta Berger and Michael Verhoeven
 2006: Bruno Ganz
 2007: Hannelore Elsner
 2008: Klaus Maria Brandauer
 2009: Michael Ballhaus
 2010: Manfred Krug
 2011: Katrin Sass
 2012: Otto Sander

Programmes
The FilmArtFestival Mecklenburg-Pomerania is organised in various sections:

Feature Film Competition
Short Film Competition
Documentary Film Competition
Films of a guest country
Retrospective
Homage - Films with the winner of the honour prize 
Cinema of the World - Films that won FIPRESCI prizes at international film festivals
Shot in M-V - A presentation of films shot in the state Mecklenburg-Pomerania.
NDR-Special - Films produced by the North German Broadcast NDR
SKY-Special - Films presented by the TV-Channel sky Germany
Kid's Movies
Forum for the Arts - Readings, Concerts, Exhibitions and Performances

Guest countries

 1998: Sandinavia
 1999: The Netherlands
 2000: France
 2001: Italy
 2002: Poland
 2003: Hungary
 2004: Iceland
 2005: Switzerland
 2006: Portugal
 2007: Norway
 2008: Austria
 2009: USA
 2010: Germany
 2011: Israel
 2012: Russia

References

External links

FilmArtFestival Official Website
The organiser and host of the festival
The Filmland's location service

Film festivals in Germany
Events in Mecklenburg-Western Pomerania
Film festivals established in 1992
Spring (season) events in Germany